Milan Antal (1935–1999) was a Slovak astronomer.

A distinguished observer of comets and minor planets, he has determined exact astrometric positions from photographic plates for many thousands of small Solar System bodies.

The main-belt asteroid 6717 Antal, discovered by German astronomers Freimut Börngen and Lutz Schmadel in 1990, is named in his honour.

References 
 

1935 births
1999 deaths
20th-century astronomers
Slovak astronomers
Discoverers of asteroids